Locusts is a 2019 independent feature film written and produced by Dr. Angus Watts and directed by Heath Davis starring Ben Geurens, Jessica McNamee, Nathaniel Dean in lead roles. It was distributed in Australia and New Zealand by Bonsai Films.

It also marks the acting debut of rugby league player George Burgess. It has Chris Bland as DOP, Rick Beecroft as assistant director, Tiare Tomaszewski as line producer, Jason King as associate producer, and Carlo Crescini as production designer.

The film is the final onscreen role of Australian actor Damian Hill who died in September 2018.

Plot 
The plot is set in a fictional post mining boom town where drugs, unemployment, and desperation have become rife. A tech entrepreneur, Ryan Black, returns reluctantly to his hometown for his father's funeral. He gets reunited with his ex-con brother, Tyson. The plot also includes Isabella, a single mother played by Jessica McNamee. George Burgess plays a bouncer.

Cast 
 Ben Geurens as Ryan Black
 Nathaniel Dean as Tyson Black
 Jessica McNamee as Isabella
 Justin Rosniak as Benny
 Steve Le Marquand as Cain
 Damian Hill as Davo
 Andy McPhee as Jake
 Alan Dukes as McCrea
 Kenneth Moraleda as Aristotle
 Caroline Brazier as Dr Matheson
 Ryan Morgan as Caleb

References 

2019 films
Australian crime thriller films
2010s crime thriller films
2010s English-language films